Joanne Nicholas (née Wright, born 10 October 1977) is a female badminton player from the United Kingdom.

She attended Churchtown Primary School, Stanley High School and King George V College ("KGV"), all in Southport, Merseyside.

Wright competed in badminton at the 2004 Summer Olympics in women's doubles with partner Ella Tripp.  They had a bye in the first round and were defeated by Lotte Bruil and Mia Audina of the Netherlands in the sixteenth round.

References

 
 
 

1977 births
Living people
Sportspeople from Southport
English female badminton players
Badminton players at the 2004 Summer Olympics
Badminton players at the 2006 Commonwealth Games
Olympic badminton players of Great Britain
Commonwealth Games silver medallists for England
Commonwealth Games medallists in badminton
People educated at King George V College
Medallists at the 2006 Commonwealth Games